Synapse: The Electronic Music Magazine was a bi-monthly American magazine about synthesizers and electronic music published March 1976 to June 1979.  During an era when commercial synthesizers were still pretty new and mostly DIY, Synapse was notable for its high production values, interviews with famous musicians, and articles by well-known writers.

The first production team consisted of editor Douglas Lynner, art director Chris August, photographer Bill Matthias and technical illustrator/circulation/publisher Angela Schill.  Staff changes brought managing editors Colin Gardner and Melodie Bryant.  After 14 issues they ran out of funds and closed down.

The magazine issues have been scanned and posted online by its founder Cynthia Webster at Cyndustries, but have now been removed.

Publication history

References

External links
 Synapse archive
 Synapse archive on Monoskop Log

Bimonthly magazines published in the United States
Music magazines published in the United States
Defunct magazines published in the United States
Magazines established in 1976
Magazines disestablished in 1979
Magazines published in Los Angeles